Nan Wood may refer to:

Nan Wood Graham (1899–1990), sister of painter Grant Wood and model for American Gothic
Nan Wood Honeyman (1881–1970),  U.S. Representative from Oregon

See also
Nan Woods (born 1966), American actress